Robert "Bob" Adams (20 December 1924 – February 23, 2019) was a Canadian decathlete who competed in the 1952 Summer Olympics. He also represented Canada at the 1954 British Empire and Commonwealth Games, taking part in the pole vault and high jump disciplines. He was born in Alsask, Saskatchewan.

References

1924 births
2019 deaths
Sportspeople from Saskatchewan
Canadian decathletes
Canadian male pole vaulters
Canadian male high jumpers
Olympic track and field athletes of Canada
Athletes (track and field) at the 1952 Summer Olympics
Commonwealth Games competitors for Canada
Athletes (track and field) at the 1954 British Empire and Commonwealth Games